Dos Caminos Sport Club (usually called Dos Caminos) was a professional club. The club has won six First Division titles in the amateur era. The club is based in Caracas.

Honours
Primera División Venezolana: 6
Winners (6): 1936, 1937, 1938, 1942, 1945, 1949
Runner-up (7): 1932, 1933, 1934, 1935, 1940, 1941, 1944

External links
Dos Caminos SC 

Football clubs in Venezuela
Football clubs in Caracas
1925 establishments in Venezuela
Association football clubs established in 1925
Defunct football clubs in Venezuela